Fred the Caveman (French-language title Fred des Cavernes) is an animated series about the misadventures of the titular caveman. The show was produced by Antefilms and Tube Studios, and consists of a single season of 13 episodes, or 39 shorts of about 7 minutes each. 

It was first shown on Teletoon in Canada on September 2, 2002, with the final episode airing on November 1, 2002. In France, it aired on Télétoon and M6, with the former channel being involved in production as early as 1999.

References 

Teletoon original programming
2002 Canadian television series debuts
2002 Canadian television series endings
2000s Canadian animated television series
Canadian children's animated comedy television series
2002 French television series debuts
2002 French television series endings
2000s French animated television series
French children's animated comedy television series
Television series about cavemen